The Badener Meile is a Group 2 flat horse race in Germany open to thoroughbreds aged three years or older. It is run over a distance of 1,600 metres (about 1 mile) at Baden-Baden in May or June.

History
A different event called the Badener Meile was established at Baden-Baden in 1927. It was renamed the Oettingen-Rennen in 1970.

The current Badener Meile was introduced in 1979. It was initially restricted to horses aged four or older. It was opened to three-year-olds in 1985. It was promoted to Group 2 class in 2015.

Records
Most successful horse:
 no horse has won this race more than once

Leading jockey (3 wins):
 Andrasch Starke – Chato (1995), Waky Nao (1998), Aspectus (2009)
 Adrie de Vries – Wiesenpfad (2008), Alianthus (2011), Nica (2020)

Leading trainer (3 wins):
 Heinz Jentzsch – Bonito (1979), Sharp End (1984), Zampano (1989)

Winners

See also
 List of German flat horse races

References
 Racing Post / siegerlisten.com:
 1983, 1984, 1985, 1986, 1987, 1988, 
 
 galopp-sieger.de – Badener Meile.
 horseracingintfed.com – International Federation of Horseracing Authorities – Badener Meile (2013).
 pedigreequery.com – Badener Meile – Baden-Baden.

Open mile category horse races
Sport in Baden-Württemberg
Horse races in Germany
1979 establishments in West Germany
Recurring sporting events established in 1979